Delphinium parishii, the desert larkspur, is a flowering plant in the family Ranunculaceae (the buttercup family) native to the Mojave Desert, in the southwestern United States and northwest Mexico.  In Southern California it is also found in the Tehachapi Mountains, Transverse Ranges, and eastern Sierra Nevada.

Description
Delphinium parishi is a perennial herbaceous plant growing to 17–60 cm tall, rarely to 100 cm tall, with palmately lobed leaves which often shrivel by the time of flowering.

The flowers vary across the species' range, from dark blue to purplish near Joshua Tree National Park, sky-blue in the eastern and northern parts of the desert, and pink in some areas in California. Each flower can be multi-hued as well, often with upper true petals white, nectar spur darker blue or purple, and sepals light blue with darker tips. Flowering occurs between April and June.

References

Mojave Desert Wildflowers, Jon Mark Stewart, 1998, pg. 169.
Wildflowers of the Eastern Sierra Nevada and Adjoining Mojave Desert and Great Basin, Laird Blackwell,2002, pg. 71.

External links
Jepson Manual Treatment: Delphinium parishii
Delphinium parishii – U.C. Photo gallery

parishii
Flora of California
Flora of Arizona
Flora of Baja California
Flora of Utah
Flora of the California desert regions
Natural history of the California chaparral and woodlands
Natural history of the Mojave Desert
Natural history of the Peninsular Ranges
Natural history of the Transverse Ranges
North American desert flora
Flora without expected TNC conservation status